The ciud-siorraig was a kind of wool winder, with an arrangement of toothed wheels, worked by the revolving winder, and with a spring which makes a sound when the number of threads forming a "cut" is wound around the rim of the winder wheel.

See also
Crois-iarna
Niddy noddy
Spinners weasel
Swift (textiles)

References
 (Ciud-siorraig)

Scottish culture
Knitting